Ulyanovsk Aircraft Museum, also known as Muzey Grazhdanskoy Aviatsii or Museum of the History of Civil Aviation, is a public museum that displays Soviet aircraft which are retired from service, and exhibits over 4000 items.It is located next to the Ulyanovsk Baratayevka Airport in Ulyanovsk, Russia. The museum is owned by the Ulyanovsk Institute of Civil Aviation.

History 
The creation of the museum was led by the head of the department of educational institutions of the USSR Civil Aviation Administration Darymov Yuri Petrovich and the deputy head of the center of the CA CMEA Vladimir Pavlovich Deldyuzhov.

In 1983, the museum was opened on the territory of the Ulyanovsk Higher Civil Aviation School.

In 1989, the museum was awarded the honorary title of "People's Museum".

In 1999, the museum became a member of the Association of Technical Museums of the International Union ICOM.

On 14 January 2016, an exposition dedicated to Air Chief Marshal Boris Pavlovich Bugaev was opened in the first hall of the museum in connection with the renaming of the institute, which owned the museum, from “Ulyanovsk Higher Civil Aviation School" to "Ulyanovsk Civil Aviation Institute".

Exhibitions 
The museum contains four halls that illustrates the history of aviation from the period of the Russia Civil War to the present, as well as simulators used for training pilots.lt also includes a photo-documentary exposition which reflects the main stages in the development of the history of Civil Aviation in Russia.

The museum exhibits 41 aircraft. All of the aircraft on display were transferred here after being decommissioned, some found by search groups and aviation enthusiasts in Russia.

List of aircraft on display

Gallery

See Also 

 Central Air Force Museum
 Ryazan Museum of Long-Range Aviation
 Taganrog Aviation Museum

References

External links
information about the museum

Ulyanovsk
Aerospace museums in Russia